This page documents notable tornadoes and tornado outbreaks worldwide in 2023. Strong and destructive tornadoes form most frequently in the United States, Argentina, Brazil, Bangladesh, and Eastern India, but can occur almost anywhere under the right conditions. Tornadoes also develop occasionally in southern Canada during the Northern Hemisphere's summer and somewhat regularly at other times of the year across Europe, Asia, Argentina, Australia and New Zealand. Tornadic events are often accompanied by other forms of severe weather, including strong thunderstorms, strong winds, and hail.

There have been 260 preliminary filtered reported tornadoes and 218 confirmed tornadoes in the United States in 2023. Worldwide, 10 tornado-related deaths have been confirmed, nine of them in the United States and one in Saudi Arabia.

January saw the third-highest number of tornado watches and confirmed tornadoes of any January on record in the United States. Additionally, the first two months of the year saw the fourth-highest number of confirmed tornadoes for the first 59 days of any year on record.

Events

United States yearly total

January

There were 125 confirmed tornadoes in the United States in the month of January.

January 2–4

In early January, a three-day severe weather outbreak brought damaging winds, large hail, and numerous tornadoes to the Southern United States and impacted the Midwestern United States to a lesser extent. On January 2, the Storm Prediction Center issued an enhanced risk for all of Arkansas and parts of surrounding states, with a 10% hatched risk for tornadoes. An EF1 tornado damaged homes and the high school in Jessieville, Arkansas, injuring two people. A large 1.1 mi (1.8 km) wide EF2 tornado caused severe damage near Jonesboro, Louisiana, snapping many large trees, inflicting significant damage to several residences, and injuring three people. Another strong EF2 tornado knocked down metal truss electrical transmission towers near Haile and destroyed an outbuilding. A third large, long-tracked EF2 tornado damaged or destroyed multiple houses, vehicles, and a mobile home in Montrose, Arkansas, and snapped or uprooted countless trees and many power poles along its path. The next day, another enhanced risk was issued farther east in the Gulf Coast region, with a 10% hatched risk area for tornadoes in place for parts of Louisiana, Mississippi, and Alabama. An EF2 tornado downed many large trees, tore most of the roof off a house, caused roof damage to other homes, and destroyed boathouses and outbuildings at the Jordan Lake Reservoir near Deatsville, Alabama. Several tornadoes touched down as far north as Illinois, including two separate EF0 and EF1 tornadoes that caused damage to outbuildings and farm equipment near Maroa. Another pair of EF1 and EF0 tornadoes also briefly touched down in Decatur, with the EF1 tornado damaging a vacant bowling alley and the EF0 tornado causing minor damage at Richland Community College. Tornadoes continued touching down into the morning of January 4, including a high-end EF1 tornado that damaged several homes, flipped cars, and severely injured a person on the eastern side of Montgomery, Alabama. In Georgia, an EF1 tornado struck the small community of Roosterville, where a barn and a mobile home were destroyed. An EF1 tornado also struck Sandersville, where homes and a warehouse were damaged and many trees were downed, some of which landed on structures. A semi-truck was overturned in Sandersville, injuring the driver. Additional weak tornadoes touched down across parts of the Carolinas later that day before the outbreak came to an end. Cane Creek State Park recorded  of rain, their largest 24-hour total on record. Daily rainfall records were also established in Memphis, Tennessee and Jackson, Mississippi with Amtrak's northbound City of New Orleans being delayed due to flooding and debris on the tracks between the two cities. Overall, a total of 58 tornadoes were confirmed.

January 12

A significant tornado outbreak impacted the Southeastern United States, with several strong and long-tracked tornadoes touching down and causing multiple fatalities. On January 12, the SPC issued an enhanced risk of severe weather, including a 10% risk area for tornadoes. Multiple supercell thunderstorms formed in the threat area later that day, and significant tornadoes began touching down. In Alabama, the small towns of Emelle, Eutaw, and Movico were all impacted by EF2 tornadoes, resulting in extensive damage. A large high-end EF2 tornado also caused severe structural damage in Selma, Alabama. Many homes and businesses sustained major damage in Selma, and a daycare with 70 children plus workers was destroyed, but only one minor injury occurred inside, one of two injuries reported from the tornado. The same storm that produced the Selma tornado later produced a long-tracked EF3 tornado that prompted tornado emergencies for Autauga, Elmore, Chilton, Coosa, and northern Tallapoosa counties. This deadly tornado caused seven fatalities in the Old Kingston community of Autauga County as it completely obliterated numerous mobile homes, as well as tossing vehicles and causing massive timber damage. Multiple strong tornadoes, which were all spawned by the Selma supercell, also impacted parts of Georgia, including an EF2 tornado that inflicted major damage to homes and industrial buildings in the southern part of LaGrange. A large EF3 tornado struck the western edge of Griffin and Experiment, badly damaging or destroying homes and businesses, and flipping cars. This tornado was accompanied by three other tornadoes at the beginning of its track near Griffin, including a high-end EF2 tornado that caused considerable damage to homes and trees. Another high-end EF2 tornado also caused significant damage in Jenkinsburg and near Jackson Lake, resulting in one fatality when a tree fell onto a car along with an indirect fatality the next day when falling tree limb knocked a transportation worker out of a bucket truck while he working to restore power lines. A high-end EF1 tornado also touched down near the Atlanta suburb of Mableton, damaging an industrial business and downing many trees, some of which landed on homes. Other weak tornadoes were confirmed in parts of Mississippi, Tennessee, Kentucky, Illinois, and the Carolinas. Overall, this outbreak produced a total of 41 tornadoes and resulted in eight fatalities, along with at least 53 injuries.

January 17 (Italy)
A brief but strong tornado struck Valmontone, which is part of the Metropolitan City of Rome Capital, causing significant damage in the comune. The tornado was spawned by an embedded "comma head" circulation and was captured by a surveillance camera. Multiple homes, apartment buildings, and a few other structures had severe roof damage, and the top floor of one residence was completely destroyed. Trees, gates, and fences were knocked down, and debris was strewn across yards and roads. After the tornado, Valmontone declared a state of disaster.

January 22

A line of severe storms produced damaging straight-line winds and multiple tornadoes in the Florida Panhandle and Southeast Georgia throughout January 22, including two low-end EF2 tornadoes. The first one struck the community of Turquoise Beach, Florida to the northeast of Santa Rosa Beach, downing trees and damaging several homes. Three of the houses that were damaged had significant portions of their roofs uplifted. The other strong tornado struck the northern side of Adel, Georgia, shifting multiple buildings off their foundations, including a metal structure that was completely destroyed. It also destroyed a motorhome, knocked over a series of centerline irrigation pivots, and damaged trees, some of which fell on homes. Three EF1 tornadoes also touched down elswhere in Georgia that day, bringing the final tornado tally to five.

January 24–25

On January 24, the Storm Prediction Center issued an enhanced risk for much of the Gulf Coast region, including a 10% hatched risk area for tornadoes. Throughout the day, a small but significant outbreak of tornadoes impacted the Southeastern United States, primarily from Southeast Texas to southern Louisiana. Multiple strong tornadoes were confirmed, including a large and destructive low-end EF3 tornado that moved through the southeastern sections of the Houston metropolitan area, impacting the suburbs of Pasadena and Deer Park. This prompted the issuance of a tornado emergency, the first ever issued by the National Weather Service's forecast office in Houston. The intense rain-wrapped tornado inflicted major structural damage to many homes, apartment buildings, churches, and businesses, and downed many trees and power lines. Cars were thrown and mangled, a metal building was destroyed, a senior center sustained major damage, and metal truss electrical tranmission towers were toppled to the ground. No fatalities occurred as a result of the EF3 Houston metro tornado, though a few minor injuries were reported. The same storm also produced two EF0 tornadoes that caused minor damage in the Houston suburbs of Sienna and Pearland prior to spawning the EF3 tornado. Elsewhere, a brief EF2 tornado unroofed a house and destroyed a barn near Nome. Three people were injured by another EF2 tornado that touched down near Orangefield before striking the outskirts of Orange, causing major damage to mobile homes, houses, and outbuildings before crossing into Louisiana and inflicting more severe damage to numerous structures north of Vinton. Several metal buildings were also damaged, and many large trees were snapped or uprooted by this tornado as well. In Louisiana, another EF2 tornado struck the small community of Gaytine, where houses had their roofs torn off, a mobile home was destroyed, a metal building was heavily damaged, and a fifth-wheel RV trailer was flipped. In Ventress, three people were injured by an EF1 tornado that destroyed a few mobile homes. Three additional weak tornadoes touched down in Florida on January 25 before the outbreak came to an end. A total of 15 tornadoes were confirmed.

February

There were 53 confirmed tornadoes in the United States in the month of February.

February 1 (Germany)

On February 1, multiple severe thunderstorms formed in Germany, producing two tornadoes. The first was a short-lived F1 tornado which tracked for 0.2 km (0.1 mi), damaging the roofs of 14 homes in Hinte. The second tornado struck areas near the small villages of Getmold, Lashorst and Hedem along a 5.3 km (3.3 mi)-long path, snapping or uprooting large trees and heavily damaging the roofs of multiple homes. A car was damaged by a falling tree near Lashorst, a carriage house had its roof torn off, and a carport was damaged at a farmstead. The most significant damage occurred in an area of pine forest, where many large trees were completely mowed down or stripped of their limbs, and a few tree trunks were snapped off and thrown some distance into nearby fields. Based on the severe tree damage, the second tornado was given an F2 rating. Over 85 severe weather reports were documented in Europe that day, 69 of those in Germany.

February 8–9

On February 8, the Storm Prediction Center issued an enhanced risk of severe weather for parks of Arkansas, Mississippi, and Louisiana, including a 10% hatched risk area for tornadoes. A line of severe storms produced damaging straight-line winds and multiple tornadoes in Mississippi and Louisiana throughout the day, a couple of which were strong. An EF2 tornado struck the village of Tangipahoa in eastern Louisiana, damaging trees and structures in town, including a church and gas station convenience store that both suffered significant damage. Numerous mobile homes were damaged or destroyed in town, a vacant business was unroofed, and many trees were snapped or uprooted as well. Another EF2 tornado struck the community of Grand Prairie, Louisiana, where a well-built home had its roof torn off and trees were snapped. A few other homes and outbuildings along its path suffered more minor damage. Several other weaker tornadoes touched down during the evening across the same region. After roughly 24 hours of no activity, a ninth tornado associated with the same storm system touched down in the Florida Panhandle late on February 9, snapping or uprooting numerous trees near Eucheeanna. In total, nine tornadoes were confirmed.

February 16–17

On February 16, the Storm Prediction Center issued an enhanced risk for parts of the Southeastern United States and the Ohio Valley region, including a 10% hatched risk area for tornadoes in parts of Mississippi, Alabama, and Tennessee. Severe thunderstorms developed later that day, producing damaging winds, large hail, and several tornadoes, a couple of which were strong. An EF2 tornado near Pindall, Arkansas destroyed barns, pushed a house off its foundation, snapped trees, and injured two people. Another EF2 tornado injured one person, snapped many trees, and knocked over a few metal truss electrical transmission towers near Ripley, Mississippi, before weakening and striking the north edge of town, where a few homes and businesses sustained minor damage. An EF1 tornado that occurred near Wesson, Mississippi rolled and destroyed a mobile home, and damaged two other residences. An EF1 tornado near Ramer, Tennessee inflicted heavy roof damage to a home and destroyed two garages, and another EF1 tornado near Lewisburg damaged homes, destroyed barns and outbuildings, and downed trees. On February 17, an EF1 tornado caused considerable damage as it moved through the south side of LaGrange, Georgia, not far from where a damaging EF2 tornado had struck the prior month. Many trees were snapped or uprooted in LaGrange, while homes and businesses sustained roof and window damage. Overall, a total of 13 tornadoes were confirmed. In addition to tornadoes, straight-line winds from the system led to a tree falling at the Northwestern University campus, injuring four people. Flooding caused by the storms also killed two people, one in Kentucky and one in West Virginia. Flooding also resulted in Interstate 65 being shut down near Cullman, Alabama.

February 26–27

On February 26, a large storm system produced a wide range of significant weather events across a large area of the United States, ranging from heavy snow to tornadoes. The Storm Prediction Center issued a moderate risk for west-central Oklahoma, including a 10% hatched risk area for tornadoes. An enhanced risk also extended from the Texas Panhandle to southwestern Missouri. Aided by very strong wind shear, a powerful squall line of severe thunderstorms containing damaging straight-line winds and multiple embedded QLCS tornadoes formed and moved through the risk area later that night. A high-end EF2 tornado obliterated manufactured homes, tossed vehicles, and killed one person as it moved through the outskirts of Cheyenne, Oklahoma, injuring three others as well. The line of severe storms also produced five tornadoes that impacted areas in and around the Oklahoma City metropolitan area, a couple of which were strong. This included a high-end EF2 tornado that struck the southeastern part of Norman, where homes and businesses sustained major damage, self-storage units were destroyed, cars were flipped, and 12 people were injured. Another high-end EF2 tornado also caused significant damage to homes and other structures near Shawnee. Tornadic activity continued the next day in Illinois, Indiana and Ohio as the system pushed eastward. Several weak tornadoes occurred, including a high-end EF1 tornado that touched down in Jacksonburg, Ohio before it passed near Middletown, causing considerable damage to a few homes, barns, and trees. In all, 30 tornadoes were confirmed, resulting in one tornado-related fatality; the 12 tornadoes in Oklahoma set the record for the most tornadoes ever recorded in the state in the month of February. In addition, there were 12 other non-tornado related fatalities that occurred as a result of the storm system.

March

There have been 40 confirmed tornadoes in the United States in the month of March.

March 1–3

In early March, a powerful storm system brought widespread severe weather, including multiple tornadoes, across a large portion of the Eastern United States. On March 1, the Storm Prediction Center outlined a enhanced risk across areas in Texas, Oklahoma, Arkansas, Mississippi, and Tennessee, including a 10% hatched risk for tornadoes. In Shottsville, Alabama, a low-end EF1 tornado caused minor damage to a church, before downing trees and damaging the roof of a house elsewhere along the path. A stronger, but short-lived high-end EF1 tornado touched down in a subdivision near Hazel Green, Alabama, where a few homes sustained extensive damage and a vehicle was flipped onto its side. On March 2, the Storm Prediction Center issued a moderate risk for the following day for parts of Texas, Arkansas, and Louisiana. A 15% hatched risk for tornadoes was in place across the Ark-La-Tex region, with the potential for strong tornadoes noted, although this was downgraded to a 10% hatched area due to lingering uncertainties about the convective modes that day. However, a 45% hatched area for wind damage was also in place in the same general area as well. A high-end EF2 tornado completely demolished two chicken houses and a mobile home, snapped many trees and power poles, partially unroofed a house, and injured five people near Kirby, Arkansas. Several other tornadoes touched down throughout the threat area, though all were weak. This included an EF1 tornado that damaged numerous homes and a few businesses as it moved through the southeastern side of Shreveport, Louisiana, injuring two people. A high-end EF1 tornado also damaged multiple buildings as it impacted Pickton, Texas. On March 3, the storm system moved into the Ohio Valley region, where an EF2 tornado in the small community or Fremont, Kentucky destroyed outbuildings, heavily damaged a church, and tore the roofs off of a few homes. In Vanderburgh County, Indiana, an EF1 tornado unroofed a church and damaged many homes and trees in the Saint Joseph community. Another EF1 tornado tracked from Duff to northwestern part of Jasper, downing many trees, damaging or destroying a few barns, and inflicting roof and siding damage to homes. In Highland County, Ohio, an EF1 tornado caused considerable damage to homes and outbuildings in and around Pricetown, downed numerous trees and tree limbs, and tore much of the roof off a church elsewhere along its path. Farther south, two EF1 tornadoes in Alabama caused minor to moderate damage in and around Section and Rosalie. An EF1 tornado also downed many trees in and around Gray Court, South Carolina, some of which landed on houses. In addition to the tornadoes, the severe thunderstorms brought numerous reports of damaging straight-line winds and flooding. Overall, a total of 33 tornadoes were confirmed. While no tornado related fatalities occurred, at least 13 non tornado-related deaths occurred as a result of the storm system.

March 9 (France)
On March 9, a tornado was caught on video from multiple angles as it impacted areas in and around several small towns and villages in the Nouvelle-Aquitaine region of France, resulting in considerable damage. The tornado first badly damaged the roof of a school in Masbaraud-Mérignat before it moved to the northeast and struck Pontarion, where multiple homes and other structures had their roofs heavily damaged. Vehicles in town were damaged by flying debris, trees and power poles were downed, and a large masonry outbuilding had its second floor destroyed. The tornado moved through wooded areas outside of Pontarion as well, snapping and uprooting many large trees. Towards the end of the path, 17 homes sustained minor damage in the Le Donzeil area before the tornado dissipated. The tornado has not received a rating from the European Severe Storms Laboratory or the French Observatory of Tornadoes and Violent Thunderstorms (Keraunos). Keraunos noted that the environment where the tornado formed was conductive for tornado development, as high instability and shear were both present in France that day.

March 13 (Saudi Arabia) 
A large dusty tornado caused significant damage as it touched down near the outskirts of Taif, Saudi Arabia, resulting in one fatality. A few buildings sustained major damage, including loss of roofs and exterior walls. Power poles and iron fence posts were knocked over, while cars and trucks were  thrown and severely damaged. A man was killed by flying debris, and at least one person was severely injured.

See also

 Weather of 2023
 Tornado
 Tornadoes by year
 Tornado records
 Tornado climatology
 Tornado myths
 List of tornado outbreaks
 List of F5 and EF5 tornadoes
 List of F4 and EF4 tornadoes
 List of F4 and EF4 tornadoes (2020–present)
 List of North American tornadoes and tornado outbreaks
 List of 21st-century Canadian tornadoes and tornado outbreaks
 List of European tornadoes and tornado outbreaks
 List of tornadoes and tornado outbreaks in Asia
 List of Southern Hemisphere tornadoes and tornado outbreaks
 List of tornadoes striking downtown areas
 List of tornadoes with confirmed satellite tornadoes
 Tornado intensity
 Fujita scale
 Enhanced Fujita scale
 International Fujita scale
 List of tornadoes rated on the International Fujita scale
 TORRO scale

References

2023 meteorology
 
Tornadoes
Natural disasters in the United States
Tornado-related lists by year